Live at Ronnie Scott's is an album by American blues artist Taj Mahal recorded at Ronnie Scott's Jazz Club in 1988 and released in 1990.

Track listing

 "Big Blues"
 "Mail Box Blues"
 "Stagger Lee"
 "Come On in My Kitchen"
 "Local, Local Girl"
 "Soothin'"
 "Fishin' Blues" 
 "Statesboro' Blues" 
 "Everybody Is Somebody"
 "Taj Mahal Interview"

References 

1990 live albums
Taj Mahal (musician) live albums
Albums recorded at Ronnie Scott's Jazz Club